Sir John Meller (c.1588 – 1649/50)) of Bridehead House, Little Bredy , Dorset was an English politician who sat in the House of Commons  in 1628 and 1640. He supported the Royalist cause in the English Civil War.

Meller was the eldest son of Sir Robert Meller of Little Bredy and his wife Dorothy Bailie daughter of Harry Bailie of the Isle of Wight. He was educated at Dorset School, Dorchester under Mr Harris and was admitted at Caius College, Cambridge on 15 March 1603 aged 15. He was admitted at Inner Temple on 15 May 1606. He was knighted on 6 May 1625.

In 1628 Meller was elected Member of Parliament for Wareham and sat until 1629 when King Charles decided to rule without parliament for eleven years.  In April 1640, he was elected Member of Parliament for Bridport in the Short Parliament. He supported the King in the Civil War and compounded for £693. He was appointed High Sheriff of Dorset for 1630–31 and High Sheriff of Oxfordshire for 1633–34.
 
Meller married Mary Swinnerton daughter of John Swinnerton, Lord Mayor of London in 1612, with whom he had 3 sons and at least 5 daughters.

References

 

1580s births
Year of death missing
Alumni of Gonville and Caius College, Cambridge
Members of the Inner Temple
Cavaliers
High Sheriffs of Dorset
High Sheriffs of Oxfordshire
English MPs 1628–1629
English MPs 1640 (April)